A conquest dynasty in the history of China refers to a Chinese dynasty established by non-Han ethnicities that ruled parts or all of China proper, the traditional heartland of the Han people, and whose rulers may or may not fully assimilate into the dominant Han culture.

While it is common for historians to characterize a Chinese dynasty as being of a certain ethnic origin, there were numerous Chinese monarchs who had mixed heritage. For example, the Emperor Xiaoming of the Xianbei-led Northern Wei dynasty was of mixed Xianbei and Han heritage; he obtained his Han ancestry from his mother, the Empress Ling. Similarly, the Kangxi Emperor of the Manchu-led Qing dynasty was of mixed Manchu and Han descent; he acquired his Han ancestry from his mother, the Empress Xiaokangzhang. Therefore, the "non-Han" nature of many conquest dynasties should not be considered as absolute.

Concept 
The term "conquest dynasty" was coined by the German-American sinologist Karl August Wittfogel in his 1949 revisionist history of the Liao dynasty (916–1125). He argued that the Liao, as well as the Jin (1115–1234), Yuan (1271–1368), and Qing (1636–1912) dynasties of China were not really "Chinese", and that the ruling families did not fully assimilate into the dominant Han culture. The "conquest dynasty" concept was warmly received by mostly Japanese scholars such as Otagi Matsuo, who preferred to view these dynasties in the context of a "history of Asia" rather than a "history of China". Alternative views to the concept of "conquest dynasty" from American sinologists include Owen Lattimore's idea of the steppe as a "reservoir", Wolfram Eberhard's concept of a "superstratification" of Chinese society with nomadic peoples, and Mary C. Wright's thesis of sinicization. Among historians, the labelling of "conquest dynasties" has proven to be controversial, especially when using such characterization on dynasties such as the Jin.

Scope of China (Zhongguo) 

In the English language, "Zhongguo ren" ("People of China") is frequently confused and conflated with "Han ren" ("Han people").

Dynasties of ethnic Han origin only used "Zhongguo" ("Middle Kingdom") to explicitly refer to Han areas of their empire. The Ming dynasty used Zhongguo to refer to only Han areas of the empire, excluding areas populated by ethnic minorities under Ming rule from the definition.

The Xianbei-led Northern Wei referred to itself as "Zhongguo" and claimed yogurt as a food of Zhongguo. Similarly, the Jurchen-led Jin dynasty referred to itself as "Zhongguo".

In 1271, Kublai Khan proclaimed the Yuan dynasty with the official name "Great Yuan" and claimed succession from former Chinese dynasties from the Three Sovereigns and Five Emperors up to the Tang dynasty.

Qing emperors referred to all subjects of the Qing dynasty regardless of their ethnicity as "Chinese", and used the term "Zhongguo" as a synonym for the entire Qing Empire while using "neidi" ("inner regions") to refer only to the core area (or China proper) of the empire. The Qing Empire was viewed as a single multi-ethnic entity.

The Qing emperors governed frontier non-Han areas in a separate administrative system under the Lifan Yuan. Nonetheless, it was the Qing emperors who expanded the definition of Zhongguo and made it "flexible" by using that term to refer to the entire empire. Zhongguo was also used by the Qing Empire as an endonym in diplomatic correspondence. However, some Han subjects criticized their usage of the term and used Zhongguo only to refer to the seventeen provinces of China and three provinces of the east (Manchuria), excluding other frontier areas. Han literati who remained loyal to the Ming dynasty held to defining the old Ming borders as "China" and used the term "foreigner" to describe ethnic minorities under Qing rule, such as the Mongols, as part of their anti-Qing ideology. As the territorial borders of the Qing Empire were fixed through a series of treaties with neighboring foreign powers, it was able to inculcate in the Qing subjects a sense that China included areas such as Mongolia and Tibet due to educational reforms. Specifically, the educational reform made it clear where the borders of the Qing Empire were, even if Han subjects did not understand how the Chinese identity included Mongols and Tibetans or understand what the connotations of being "Chinese" were.

In an attempt to portray different ethnicities as part of one family ruled by the Qing dynasty, the phrase "Zhongwai yijia" ("interior and exterior as one family") was used to convey the idea of the "unification" of different ethnic groups. After conquering China proper, the Manchus identified their state as "China" ("Middle Kingdom"), and referred to it as "Dulimbai Gurun" in the Manchu language (Dulimbai means "central" or "middle", while gurun means "nation" or "state"). The emperors labelled the lands of the Qing Empire (including present-day Northeast China, Xinjiang, Mongolia, Tibet, and other areas) as "China" in both the Chinese and Manchu languages. This effectively defined China as a multi-ethnic state, thereby rejecting the idea that "China" only meant Han-populated areas. The Qing emperors proclaimed that both Han and non-Han ethnic groups were part of "China". They also used both "China" and "Qing" to refer to their state in official documents, international treaties (the Qing Empire was known internationally as "China" or the "Chinese Empire"), and foreign affairs. The "Chinese language" (Dulimbai gurun i bithe) included Chinese, Manchu, Mongol, and Tibetan languages, while the "Chinese people" (Manchu: Dulimbai gurun i niyalma) referred to all subjects of the Qing Empire.

In the 1689 Treaty of Nerchinsk, the term "China" (Dulimbai Gurun; Zhongguo) was used to refer to the Qing territories in Manchuria in both the Manchu and Chinese language versions of the treaty. Additionally, the term "the wise Emperor of China" was also used in the Manchu version of the treaty.

The Qianlong Emperor rejected the earlier idea that only the Han people could be subjects of China and only Han lands could be considered as part of China. Instead, he redefined China as being multi-ethnic, saying in 1755 that "there exists a view of China (Zhongxia), according to which non-Han peoples cannot become China's subjects and their lands cannot be integrated into the territory of China. This does not represent our dynasty's understanding of China, but is instead a view of the earlier Han, Tang, Song, and Ming dynasties." The Qianlong Emperor rejected the views of ethnic Han officials who claimed that Xinjiang was not part of China and that he should not annex it, putting forth the argument that China was multi-ethnic and did not just refer to Han areas.

When the Qing conquered Dzungaria, they proclaimed that the new land which formerly belonged to the Oirat-led Dzungar Khanate was now absorbed into China (Dulimbai Gurun) in a Manchu language memorial.

The Yongzheng Emperor spoke out against the claim by anti-Qing rebels that the Qing dynasty were only the rulers of the Manchus and not of China, saying "The seditious rebels claim that we are the rulers of Manchus and only later penetrated central China to become its rulers. Their prejudices concerning the division of their and our country have caused many vitriolic falsehoods. What these rebels have not understood is the fact that it is for the Manchus the same as the birthplace is for the people of the Central Plain. Shun belonged to the Eastern Yi, and King Wen to the Western Yi. Does this fact diminish their virtues?"

According to Russian scholars S.V. Dmitriev and S.L. Kuzmin, despite the usage of the term "China", these empires were known officially by their respective dynastic name. Non-Han peoples considered themselves as subjects of the Yuan and Qing empires, and did not necessarily equate them to "China". This resulted from different ways of the Yuan and Qing legitimization for different peoples in these empires. Qing emperors were referred to as "Bogda Khan" by their Mongol subjects. According to Dmitriev and Kuzmin, the Liao, Jin, Yuan and Qing were multi-national empires led by non-Chinese peoples, to whom the conquered China or its part was joined.

The modern territorial claims of both the People's Republic of China based in Beijing and the Republic of China based in Taipei are derived from the territories held by the Qing dynasty at the time of its demise. The nationalistic concept of the Zhonghua minzu (Chinese nation) also traces its roots to the multiethnic and multicultural nature of the Qing Empire.

Criticism
Certain traits assigned by past scholars to "conquest dynasties" to distinguish them from "native" dynasties may not have been so distinguishing. An example is the "royal hunt", which, according to David M. Robinson, "originated in China in a complex legacy of venerable Central Plain polities of high antiquity."

List of Non-Han dynasties 
This list includes only the major dynasties of China ruled by non-Han ethnicities, there were many other such dynastic regimes that ruled an area historically or currently associated with "China" not shown in this list. And not all non-Han regimes are seen as conquest dynasties, many of them are actually considered as "infiltration dynasties".

See also 
 Yuan dynasty in Inner Asia
 Qing dynasty in Inner Asia
 Ethnic groups in Chinese history
 New Qing History
 Tatar yoke
 Dynastic cycle
 Dynasties in Chinese history
 Sinicization
 De-Sinicization
 Sinocentrism
 Chinese historiography
 Mandate of Heaven
 Zhonghua minzu
 Hua–Yi distinction
 Civilization state
 Debate on the Chineseness of Yuan and Qing dynasties

References

Citations

Sources 

 
 
 
 
 

Dynasties in Chinese history
Historiography of China
Liao dynasty
Jin dynasty (1115–1234)
Yuan dynasty
Qing dynasty
Empires